The 2016 Indiana Hoosiers football team represented Indiana University Bloomington during the 2016 NCAA Division I FBS football season. The Hoosiers competed in the East Division of the Big Ten Conference and played their home games at Memorial Stadium in Bloomington, Indiana. They were led by head coach Kevin Wilson, who was in his sixth season, for twelve games. Following their win against Purdue, the Hoosiers became bowl eligible for the second year in a row and were invited to the Foster Farms Bowl.

On December 1, 2016, Indiana announced that Kevin Wilson had been dismissed due to "philosophical differences", and that Tom Allen would permanently succeed Wilson as head coach, beginning at the bowl game.

Previous season and offseason

The 2015 Indiana Hoosiers football team finished the regular season 6–6, 2–6 in Big Ten play to finish in sixth place in the Eastern Division. The highlight of the season was beating Purdue to become bowl eligible for the first time since 2007. The Hoosiers were invited to the Pinstripe Bowl where they lost to Duke in overtime.

Departures
Notable departures from the 2015 squad included:

Schedule
Indiana announced its 2016 football schedule on July 11, 2013. The 2016 schedule consists of seven home and five away games in the regular season. The Hoosiers will host Big Ten foes Maryland, Michigan State, Nebraska, Penn State, and Purdue, and will travel to Michigan, Northwestern, Ohio State, and Rutgers.

The team will host two of the three non–conference games which are against Ball State Cardinals from the Mid-American Conference (MAC), Florida International Panthers (FIU) from Conference USA, and Wake Forest Demon Deacons from the Atlantic Coast Conference (ACC).

Roster

Game summaries

at FIU

vs Ball State

vs Wake Forest

vs No. 17 Michigan State

at No. 2 Ohio State

vs No. 10 Nebraska

at Northwestern

vs Maryland

at Rutgers

vs No. 10 Penn State

at No. 4 Michigan

vs Purdue

vs No. 19 Utah (Foster Farms Bowl)

Awards and honors

Big Ten Players of the Week

Awards

References

Indiana
Indiana Hoosiers football seasons
Indiana Hoosiers football